Gendun Chompel or Gendün Chöphel (1903–1951) was a Tibetan scholar, thinker, writer, poet, linguist, and artist. He was born in 1903 in Shompongshe, Rebkong, Amdo. He was a creative and controversial figure and is considered by many to have been one of the most important Tibetan intellectuals of the twentieth century.

Chöphel was a friend of the Indian scholar and independence activist Rahul Sankrityayan. His life was the inspiration for Luc Schaedler's film The Angry Monk: Reflections on Tibet. He is best known for his collection of essays called The Madman's Middle Way: Reflections on Reality of the Tibetan Monk Gendun Chophel. and Grains of Gold: Tales of a Cosmopolitan Pilgrimage, written during his time in India and Sri Lanka in between 1934 and 1946. These essays were critical of modern Hinduism, Christianity, and British imperialism. While condemning places and events like the Black Hole of Calcutta and the Goa Inquisition, he praised certain British colonial practices like the abolition of sati.

His erotic classic, Treatise on Passion, was completed in 1939, though it was first published posthumously in 1967. Written in Tibetan verse, this poetic and practical work was inspired both by his reading and partial translation of the Kama Sutra (introduced to him by Sankrityayan) and by his own recent, and prolific, sexual awakening. The work aims to provide extensive guidance on heterosexual lovemaking and sexual happiness for both women and men in an overtly democratic spirit. By now an ex-monk, Chöphel was happy to compare favourably his detailed sexual guidance (written from a lay, tantric perspective) to that contained in an earlier – and much less explicit – work bearing a similar title composed by Mipham the Great.

See also
Tibet Improvement Party

References

Sources

Translations

Other sources

 Dhondup, K.: "Gedun Choephel: the Man Behind the Legend". Tibetan Review, vol. 13, no. 10, October 1978, p. 10–18.
 

 
 
 
Roerich, George N. and Gedun Choephel (Translator) (1988). The Blue Annals by Gö Lotsawa. Motilal Banarsidass, Delhi, 1976, Reprint in 1979. [reprint of Calcutta, Royal Asiatic Society of Bengal, 1949, in two volumes].

External links
 Gendun Choephel
The Story of a Monk Wanderer: part 1  ,  part 2  
Gendun Choephel  – Angry Monk website

1903 births
1951 deaths
Buddhist artists
Tibetan Buddhists from Tibet
Tibetan Buddhism writers
Tibetan painters
20th-century Tibetan painters
Tibetan poets